Governor Mifflin Senior High School is the only high school in the Governor Mifflin School District. Named for the Revolutionary War major and first governor of Pennsylvania, Thomas Mifflin, it is located in Shillington, Berks County, Pennsylvania and serves students in the five communities of Shillington, Kenhorst, Mohnton, Cumru, and Brecknock.

Governor Mifflin's mascot and logo is "Marvin the Mustang." The school competes at the AAAAA and AAAAAA level in the PIAA categories. As of the 2020-21 school year, Governor Mifflin Senior High School had a student population of 1,482 and 83.7 teachers of a full-time basis for a student-teacher ratio of 17.71.

History
Governor Mifflin Senior High School replaced Shillington High School in 1953. At that time, the Shillington High School building became the Governor Mifflin Junior High School. 

As Shillington High School, it was notably attended by famed American author John Updike, as well as in the graduating class of 2022, Gatorade Football Player Of The Year Nick Singleton.

School analytics 
Governor Mifflin Senior High School has a total enrollment of 1303 students. The school has a student teacher ratio of 15:1 and a graduation rate of 90%. Its student population is 48% percent female and 52% male.

Notable alumni 
 John Updike, author, Rabbit, Run

Athletics

Fall

 Cheerleading
 Cross Country
 Field Hockey
 Football
 Golf
 Marching Band
 Soccer
 Tennis
 Volleyball
 Water Polo

Winter

 Basketball
 Bowling
 Cheerleading
 Rifle
 Swimming
 Wrestling

Spring

 Baseball
 Softball
 Lacrosse
 Softball
 Tennis
 Track and Field
 Volleyball

Student-run organizations

Student Government Association (SGA) 
The Governor Mifflin SGA is a student-run body that serves as the government of student affairs. They serve to organize events such as Homecoming, Mini-thon (an event that raised over 63,000 dollars for the Four Diamonds Fund), miscellaneous spirit events, and Senior Awards.

Technology Student Association (TSA) 
The Governor Mifflin TSA is a prestigious organization founded in 2016. TSA is an Organization that seeks to empower students by exposing them to events in the engineering sphere as well as other creative disciplines. Students compete in regional, local, and can even qualify for national competitions.

Mustang Mile and Key Club 
Mustang Mile and Key Club are Clubs run by  serve in service roles in the school, community, and state. Members of these organization seek to aid new students, participate in donation drive events and soup kitchens, and assist in blood donations events through the Miller-Keystone Blood Center.

Ping Pong Club 
Ping Pong Club has the largest membership of a club at Governor Mifflin High School after its creation in 2017 by Jakob Bolles who was the organizer. Students compete in three competitive brackets to decide who is the ultimate Ping Pong champion. Unfortunately, the club has since been dismantled due to a student tearing his ACL.

Other notable clubs and organizations 

 Fellowship of Christian Athletes (FCA)
 Science Olympiad
 Enviorthon
 Its Our World Too (IOWT)
 French Club
 Spanish Club
 Thespian Society 
 Anime Club
 Ski Club
 Mock Trial 
 Harry Potter Club
 Future Business Leaders of America (FBLA)

References

External links
 Governor Mifflin High School
 Governor Mifflin School District

Public high schools in Pennsylvania
Schools in Berks County, Pennsylvania
1953 establishments in Pennsylvania
Educational institutions established in 1953